Kızılin is a village in the Nizip District, Gaziantep Province, Turkey. The village is inhabited by Kurds of the Reşwan tribe and had a population of 316 in 2021. The village is Yazidi.

References

Villages in Nizip District
Yazidi villages in Turkey
Kurdish settlements in Gaziantep Province